Eratigena duellica, the giant house spider, is a species of funnel weaver in the spider family Agelenidae. It is found in Canada, the United States, and Europe. The related species Eratigena atrica is also called the giant house spider.

Eratigena atrica was transferred from the genus Tegenaria in 2013. It was considered the same species as Eratigena atrica until 2018, when Eratigena duellica, Eratigena saeva, and Eratigena atrica were restored as separate species.

References

Agelenidae
Spiders described in 1875